Eph Hanks Tower is a 6,540-foot (1,990-meter) elevation summit located in Capitol Reef National Park, in Wayne County of Utah, United States. It towers 900 feet above the picnic area below its north aspect. Precipitation runoff from this feature is drained by Capitol Wash and Pleasant Creek, a tributary of the Fremont River, which in turn is within the Colorado River drainage basin. This geological feature is named after Ephraim Knowlton Hanks (1826–1896), a Mormon pioneer and first permanent settler in the Capitol Reef area, who with his family homesteaded in the Pleasant Creek area of Capitol Reef in 1881. Ephraim Hank's Floral Ranch on Pleasant Creek supposedly offered a safe retreat for polygamists along the Mormon underground railroad.

Geology
Eph Hanks Tower is composed of Wingate Sandstone, which is the remains of wind-borne sand dunes deposited approximately 200 million years ago in the Late Triassic. The hard Wingate Sandstone, which tends to form steep cliffs, overlays softer beds of Chinle Formation. Long after the sedimentary rocks were deposited, the Colorado Plateau was uplifted relatively evenly, keeping the layers roughly horizontal, but Capitol Reef is an exception because of the Waterpocket Fold, a classic monocline, which formed between 50 and 70 million years ago during the Laramide Orogeny.

Gallery

Climate
Spring and fall are the most favorable seasons to visit Eph Hanks Tower. According to the Köppen climate classification system, it is located in a Cold semi-arid climate zone, which is defined by the coldest month having an average mean temperature below 32 °F (0 °C), and at least 50% of the total annual precipitation being received during the spring and summer.

See also

 Colorado Plateau
 Geology of the Capitol Reef area

References

External links
 Capitol Reef National Park National Park Service
 EPH Hanks Tower: Weather forecast
 EPH Hanks Tower: Flickr photo

Mountains of Utah
Capitol Reef National Park
Mountains of Wayne County, Utah
Sandstone formations of the United States
Colorado Plateau